Minuta Molchanya known for its full title as To the Bright Memory of the Fallen in the Fight Against Fascism was an annual simultaneous broadcast aired at 18:00 UTC annually on 9 May dedicated to the victims of Great Patriotic War. It broadcast public events on all radio and television stations across Russia and ex-USSR during its Victory Day yearly. It was first broadcast on Soviet Central Television in 1965, 20 years after the Allied victory over Nazi Germany.

History 
The idea of the program was suggested by Irana Kazakova. Other people of the team who produced the first version were Ekaterina Tarkhanova, Svetlana Volodina, Arkadi Revenko, Mesyatsev, Khazanov, Levitskaya, and other people assistants, artists, musical editors, etc. At the suggestion of the director of the All-Union Radio, The shooting of the television version for the first two years was carried out in the pavilion of the Ostankino television centre, where the scenery of a fire burning in a plaster bowl against the background of a built wall was built. After the construction of the Eternal Flame at the Tomb of the Unknown Soldier, filming began to take place there. The musical compositions that sounded in the background were also selected by Tarkhanova. The program was started with the call signal of Radio Moscow and the announcement by the Soviet radio voice Yuri Levitan, famous for his announcements during the Second World War. The address was initially narrated by well-known Soviet radio commenter and actress Vera Enyutina to a choral version of Träumerei by Schumann in the background, followed by a piece from Symphony No. 6 by Tchaikovsky. The very "minute of silence" was sounded with the toll of the Moscow Kremlin bells and the clock at the Spasskaya Tower striking seven in the evening. The TV version was showing the flame on the background of a wall with the text "To the Memory of the Fallen." The program ended with pieces from Piano Concerto No. 2 by Rachmaninoff, Toccata, Adagio and Fugue in C major (BWV 564) by Bach, and Symphony No. 3 by Scriabin. Due to its solemnity the address was informally known as "the prayer".

From the moment Sergei Lapin took over as chairman of the State TV and Radio in 1970, the minute of silence for the first time underwent a number of changes. Evgeny Sinitsyn and Galina Shergova were involved in writing the new text. At one time, the program included the reading of excerpts from the book "Small Land", written by the then General Secretary of the CPSU Central Committee Leonid Brezhnev, the practice ended on Victory Day 1982. In 1973, the program began to be aired in colour.

After Yenyutina defected to the United States shortly in 1976, some TV and radio announcers began to read the text and the minor revisions changing of graphics conceptuals.

On November 7, 1987, on the day of the 70th anniversary of the October Revolution, at 13:50, a similar program, “In Memory Of The Fallen Fighters For Soviet Power", aired. The tradition which not followed the sequencing of particular matter.

From 1988 to 1991, the Second Program of the Central Television of the USSR simulcast the Minute with sign language interpretation for the deaf.

After the collapse of the USSR, the program format was redesigned to fit the new democratic Russia. In particular, the footage of the burning Eternal Flame was removed, while the rest of the video sequence, now pre-recorded, was also completely updated which including the Red Square and the veterans assembled on the Tomb of the Unknown Soldier, as well as crowd shots of those visiting. According to some reports, in the first post-Soviet years of broadcasting, the producers tried to make shots from Red Square, attracted Nikita Mikhalkov, who filmed "the crosses and domes of Russia" from a bird's eye view and personally read the offscreen text. The broadcast was aired simultaneously on state channels like First Channel Ostankino, RTR, MTK, Forth Channel Ostankino (now NTV), 2X2, TV6, and Channel 5 in Saint Petersburg. During the 1995 golden jubilee edition marking the 50th anniversary of the conclusion of the war, Moscow University Channel, TV6, REN-TV, STS, TNT, Muz-TV and other Russian private television channels began simulcasting the Minute.

In 1996, the programme was redesigned to an old Soviet-format once again, while Igor Kirillov rejoined the reading of the text from the pre-1976 version, with production now taken over by a joined group of stations. In 2003, the long overtune was cut from the programme and its running time was cut  to 6 Minutes. By then, a Belarusian version featuring the Eternal Flame in Minsk and guards of honour of the Military Commandanture had been airing since then, produced by Belteleradio for Belarus 1, whose feed is simucast on all public and private TV stations.

Since 2004, a minute of silence has been broadcast on all sports channels produced by NTV-Plus (since 2016 - by the GPM Match! Sub-holding). Followed in 2006 when all Digital Telefamily of Channel One also took the airing including some private cable TV channels (exepct on Religious and TV Shopping channels).

On May 9, 2005, in connection with the arrival in Moscow to celebrate the 60th anniversary of Victory of a large number of Foreign Delegations, the nationwide Minute of Silence was enforced in the official protocol of events and immediately preceded the festive concert on Red Square, in connection with which the broadcast was postponed from 18:55 till 19:55. During the Minute of Silence, the traditional video footage of the burning Eternal Flame was replaced for a few seconds by a direct connection from Red Square are the heads of foreign delegations, along with Russian officials, who paid tribute to the fallen.

Beginning in 2010, the footage of the Minute of Silence this time included the granite obelisk honoring the fallen from every City of Military Glory of Russia, a title bestowed beginning 2005 to cities and towns in the country that had been either battlefields or major military bases that had helped in the war effort against the Axis Powers. The red granite obelisk honoring this places had been inaugurated on Victory in Europe Day, May 8, one day before the 65th Victory Day.

On May 9, 2014, the programme was revamped again to adjust to modern broadcast standards. The Tomb Of The Unknown Soldier with the Enternal Flame was retained and all montages from people gathered were removed due to the old age of the veterans and the small declining crowd over the years. The crowd shots were replaced by pictures of some of the millions of servicemen and women who perished during the war, and the background music was updated to the coral rendition of Georgy Sviridov's composition Sacred Love. The pictures were updated every year and some photos of the fallen are provided from the "Victory in Faces" Historical Depositarium  and the Victory Museum. It used excerpts of Robert Rozhdestvensky's Requiem  read by Boris Mironov and Lyubov Germanova while Kirillov retained the conclusion at the end of the program. Also RT now broadcasts in English, Spanish and Arabic languages the Minute itself for the benefit of its international viewers, from 2007 to 2013 it broadcast the whole program dubbed in these languages.

In 2015, a fragment of Putin's speech was replaced for the commemoration of the 70th anniversary of Victory Day, The initial landscape sketch of Moscow was also supplemented by a plan towards the Historical Museum, and the speech was added "heads of foreign delegations, the president, veterans in the stands, parade participants paid tribute to the memory of the victims"

On May 9, 2020, during the Coronavirus pandemic in Russia in which the traditional was Parade postponed and all people were still required to stay home, the tradition in the singing of "Den Pobedy" was added while people singing this with their balconies across major cities featuring the voices of Russian pop artists Lev Leshchenko, Vladimir Pozner, Tatiana Tarasova, and Dmitry Kharatyan among others. Produced by Russia-1, it aired following the 55th Minute of Silence.

Announcers 
 Igor Kirillov (1976-1983, 1990–91, 1996-2011)
 Alexy Zadachin (1984–85)
 Olga Vystotskaya (1986–89)
 Evgeny Khoroshevtsev (2012–13)
 Boris Mironov and Lyubov Germanova (2014–present)

References

External links 
 Minute of Silence text (Russian)
 First Minute of Silence (1965) audio, narrated by Vera Enyutina and Yuri Levitan
 Minute of Silence (2012) video, narrated by Igor Kirillov and E. Khoroshevtsev
 Minyuta Molchanya 2014 (2021 ver.), Video

Television in the Soviet Union
Radio in the Soviet Union
Aftermath of World War II in the Soviet Union
1945 in the Soviet Union
1960s Soviet television series